Sanders Nunatak is a prominent (850 m) rising above the ice of to the south of Noxon Cliff, in Asgard Range, Victoria Land, Antarctica. Named by Advisory Committee on Antarctic Names (1997) after Ryan Sanders, of NOAA, a member of the National Ozone Expedition to the McMurdo Station area in 1986 and 1987, returning as principal investigator in 1991, 1992, 1994 and 1996.

Nunataks of Victoria Land
McMurdo Dry Valleys